William Doherty (May 15, 1857 in Cincinnati – May 25, 1901 in Nairobi) was an American entomologist who specialised in Lepidoptera and later also collected birds for the Natural History Museum at Tring. He died of dysentery while in Nairobi.

Travels

From 1877 to 1881, before he became a collector, he traveled widely in Europe, the Middle East and thence to Persia. His entomological collecting activities commenced in earnest in 1882 while in South Asia. He collected butterflies in India, Burma, the Andaman Islands, Nicobar, Siam, Indonesia, Malaysia, New Guinea and British East Africa and described many new species. After a visit to Hartert at Tring in 1895, he was recruited by Walter Rothschild, 2nd Baron Rothschild, who came to regarded him as his best bird collector. While collecting in Uganda, he fell ill and was carried to a hospital by his Lepcha collectors.

Collections
His collections are shared between the American Museum of Natural History, the Carnegie Museum in Pittsburgh, the Brooklyn Museum, the Museum of Comparative Zoology in Cambridge, and the National Museum of Natural History in Washington.

Eponyms
Many of the birds he collected for Lord Rothschild were named after him, including Doherty's bushshrike Malaconotus dohertyi, red-naped fruit dove Ptilinopus dohertyi, Sumba cicadabird Coracina dohertyi and crested white-eye Lophozosterops dohertyi.

References

External links
BHL Hartert, Ernst (1896) An account of the collections of birds made by Mr. William Doherty in the Eastern Archipelago London.
 Obituary by Ernst Hartert (1901) in Novitates Zoologicae, vol. 8, p. 494f.

1857 births
1901 deaths
Deaths from dysentery
Infectious disease deaths in Kenya
American lepidopterists
19th-century American zoologists
20th-century American zoologists